Brian Baker (August 9, 1973 – June 24, 2021) was an American politician.

Biography
A Republican, he represented part of Cass County (District 123) in the Missouri House of Representatives. He was elected to the House in November 2002. He served from 2002 to 2008. He later served as the Northern Commissioner for Cass County from 2008 until 2016.

Baker died from COVID-19 in June 2021, aged 47.

Education
Brian Baker received his education from the following institutions:
MA, Religious Studies, Midwestern Baptist Theological Seminary, 2002
BA, English Literature, Central Missouri State University, 1998

References

Republican Party members of the Missouri House of Representatives
1973 births
2021 deaths
University of Central Missouri alumni
People from Cass County, Missouri
Deaths from the COVID-19 pandemic in Missouri